Nicolás González Fernández (born 18 January 1996) is a Spanish footballer who plays as a midfielder.

References

External links

1996 births
Living people
Association football midfielders
Spanish footballers
Spanish expatriate footballers
Murciélagos FC footballers
Club Portugalete players
Ascenso MX players
Tercera División players
Spanish expatriate sportspeople in Mexico
Expatriate footballers in Mexico